Acer gracilifolium is an Asian species of maple. It has been found only in Gansu and Sichuan Provinces in west-central China.

Acer gracilifolium is a small tree up to 5 meters tall with smooth brown or gray bark. Leaves are egg-shaped or oblong, non-compound, thin and papery, up to 8 cm wide and 5 cm across usually with 3 lobes, with a waxy, whitish underside.

References

gracilifolium
Plants described in 1981
Flora of Vietnam
Flora of Yunnan